In enzymology, a (RS)-norcoclaurine 6-O-methyltransferase is an enzyme that catalyzes the chemical reaction

S-adenosyl-L-methionine + (RS)-norcoclaurine  S-adenosyl-L-homocysteine + (RS)-coclaurine

Thus, the two substrates of this enzyme are S-adenosyl methionine and (R,S)-norcoclaurine, whereas its two products are S-adenosylhomocysteine and (R,S)-coclaurine.

This enzyme belongs to the family of transferases, specifically those transferring one-carbon group methyltransferases.  The systematic name of this enzyme class is S-adenosyl-L-methionine:(RS)-norcoclaurine 6-O-methyltransferase. This enzyme participates in alkaloid biosynthesis i.

References

 
 
 

EC 2.1.1
Enzymes of unknown structure